Schoharie Valley Railroad Complex is a national historic district located at Schoharie in Schoharie County, New York. The district includes five contributing buildings and four contributing structures. The complex of buildings were built about 1875 by the Schoharie Valley Railroad.  They include the passenger station, freight / locomotive house, office, old mill building, storage facility, and four coal silos.  The four mile railroad was abandoned in 1942.

It was listed on the National Register of Historic Places in 1972.

References

Industrial buildings and structures on the National Register of Historic Places in New York (state)
Historic districts on the National Register of Historic Places in New York (state)
Historic districts in Schoharie County, New York
National Register of Historic Places in Schoharie County, New York